The Golden Horse Award for Best Documentary Feature is given at the Golden Horse Awards.

Winners and nominees 

Note: There was no Golden Horse Film Awards held in 1964 and 1974.

References

Golden Horse Film Awards